Periphyton is a complex mixture of algae, cyanobacteria, heterotrophic microbes, and detritus that is attached to submerged surfaces in most aquatic ecosystems. The related term Aufwuchs (German "surface growth" or "overgrowth") refers to the collection of small animals and plants that adhere to open surfaces in aquatic environments, such as parts of rooted plants.

Periphyton serves as an important food source for invertebrates, tadpoles, and some fish. It can also absorb contaminants, removing them from the water column and limiting their movement through the environment. The periphyton is also an important indicator of water quality; responses of this community to pollutants can be measured at a variety of scales representing physiological to community-level changes. Periphyton has often been used as an experimental system in, e.g., pollution-induced community tolerance studies.

Composition
In both marine and freshwater environments, algae – particularly green algae and diatoms – make up the dominant component of aufwuchs communities. Small crustaceans, rotifers, and protozoans are also commonly found in fresh water and the sea, but insect larvae, oligochaetes and tardigrades are peculiar to freshwater aufwuchs faunas.

Uses
Periphyton communities are used in aquaculture food production systems for the removal of solid and dissolved pollutants. Their performance in filtration is established and their application as aquacultural feed is being researched.

Periphyton serves as an indicator of water quality because:

It has a naturally high number of species.
It has a fast response to changes.
It is easy to sample.
It is known for tolerance/sensitivity to change.

Threats
A risk for periphyton stems from urbanization. Increased turbidity levels associated with urban sprawl can smother periphyton causing its detachment from the rocks on which it lives. It can be important for the clearance of harmful chemicals and reducing turbidity.

Food source
Many aquatic animals feed extensively on periphyton. The mbuna cichlids from Lake Malawi are particularly well known examples of fish adapted for feeding on periphyton. Examples include Labeotropheus trewavasae and Pseudotropheus zebra. They have scraper-like teeth that allow them to rasp the periphyton from rocks. In marine communities, periphyton food sources are important for animals such as limpets and sea urchins.  Another amphibian that feasts on periphyton are spring peepers, small chorus frogs that occupy many ponds throughout Canada and the eastern United States. Spring peepers filter periphyton from the environmental surfaces of their habitat.

See also
Biofilm

References

External links
 Marine Biological Laboratory Sustainable Aquaculture Initiative Developing plant-based fish diets and pond management protocols for the Comprehensive Development Project (CODEP) in L’Acul, Haiti
 Macrophyte and Periphyton lab
Fishbase definition of aufwuchs

Aquatic ecology
Bioindicators